David R. Stopher Gymnasium or Stopher Gym is a 3,800-seat multi-purpose arena in Thibodaux, Louisiana, United States, on the campus Nicholls State University. It is named for David R. Stopher.

It is home to the Nicholls Colonels men's and women's basketball teams and women's volleyball team. It hosts many other functions including Nicholls' commencement, Manning Passing Academy and a variety of concerts and community events.

History
The first game in Stopher Gymnasium was in 1970.

After the 2013–2014 season, the gymnasium was renovated over several years. The men's basketball locker room and offices were overhauled and redesigned. The renovations featured a private entrance for the players and coaches with updated offices for the coaches, new meeting rooms and a lobby and lounge for the players. The lounge area includes televisions and audio equipment, leading into the locker room. The athletic training room was moved to another area of the building allowing it to quadruple in size. A visiting team locker room was also built in the gymnasium. As part of the renovation in 2015, a  HD video scoreboard and scoreboards on each end of the court were added.

On January 27, 2018, the Colonels played their first game on Broussard Court. It is named after Nicholls Hall of Fame men's basketball coach Rickey Broussard. In addition to the new court, the gymnasium received new portable goals, LED scorers tables, premium courtside seating and new lighting in 2018.

Gallery

See also
 Nicholls Colonels men's basketball
 Nicholls Colonels women's basketball
 Nicholls Colonels women's volleyball
 Nicholls Colonels
 List of NCAA Division I basketball arenas
 List of indoor arenas in the United States
 List of music venues

References

External links
 Nicholls Colonels men's basketball
 Nicholls Colonels women's basketball
 Nicholls Colonels women's volleyball
 Nicholls Colonels Athletic facilities

College basketball venues in the United States
College volleyball venues in the United States
Basketball venues in Louisiana
Volleyball venues in Louisiana
Sports venues in Thibodaux, Louisiana
Sports venues in Louisiana
Indoor arenas in Louisiana
Nicholls Colonels men's basketball venues
Nicholls Colonels women's basketball venues
Nicholls Colonels women's volleyball venues
Music venues in Louisiana
Buildings and structures in Lafourche Parish, Louisiana
Sports venues completed in 1970
1970 establishments in Louisiana